Rebecca Johnson may refer to:

Rebecca Johnson (geneticist), Australian scientist
Rebecca Johnson (author), Australian author and teacher
Rebecca Johnson (activist), British peace activist
Becky Johnson (born 1978), Canadian comedian
Rebecca Johnson (diplomat), Acronym Institute for Disarmament Diplomacy
Rebecca Johnson (footballer) for Jitex BK
Rebecca Johnson, millionaire physician found murdered, see Ozark, Arkansas

See also
Rebecca Johnston (born 1989), ice hockey player